Rhododendron konori, the Konor rhododendron, is a rhododendron species native to Irian Jaya, Indonesia, and Papua New Guinea. The strongly scented flowers range from pure white to dark red.

The specific epithet is sometimes rendered konorii, but this is unnecessary as the name honours a local Papuan deity. The botanical name Rhododendron konori is regarded by some authorities as an unresolved name, meaning that it has not yet been established as a correct scientific name for this plant.

References

 Malesia 1: 200 1878.
 Steenis, C. G. G. J. van, ed. 1948–. Flora malesiana.
 The Plant List
 Encyclopedia of Life
 USDA Plants Profile
 Hirsutum.com
 "Rhododendron konori, a variable Vireya",  Arthur W. Headlam, Journal of the American Rhododendron Society, Volume 33, No. 4, Fall 1979.

konori
Taxa named by Odoardo Beccari